Cristobal Rigoberto Mendoza Carreras (born November 16, 1933), better known as Minnie Mendoza, is a former Major League Baseball infielder and coach who played for the Minnesota Twins during the 1970 MLB season.

Biography 
Minnie Mendoza was born on November 16, 1933 in Ceiba del Agua, Cuba.

Playing career 
Mendoza played 10 years for minor league Charlotte Hornets.

Mendoza played 16 games for the Minnesota Twins during the 1970 MLB season as a 36-year-old rookie.  In 16 at-bats, Mendoza compiled 3 hits and 2 runs, while recording a .188 batting average.

The Mendoza Line 
Mendoza is featured in the controversy surrounding the naming of the Mendoza Line, meaning a .200 batting average.  While most believe that the "Mendoza Line" first referred to by George Brett is named after 9-year veteran Mario Mendoza (who had a .215 career batting average and hit .198 in his biggest season), there is some controversy as to whether Brett was actually referring to Minnie Mendoza when he coined the famous phrase.  However, Minnie did not play during the time of George Brett.

Coaching career 
After retiring as a player, Mendoza was a coach for the Charlotte O's.
Mendoza was also a first base coach for the Baltimore Orioles during the 1988 season. After the 1988 season, he became a roving minor league instructor in the Orioles organization.

Mendoza was a coach for the Burlington Indians in the Appalachian League and was manager for the team in 1992.
As of 2008, Mendoza the Latin America field coordinator in the Cleveland Indians organization.

References

External links

1933 births
Living people
Baltimore Orioles coaches
Baltimore Orioles scouts
Cuban emigrants to the United States
Major League Baseball hitting coaches
Major League Baseball infielders
Major League Baseball players from Cuba
Cuban expatriate baseball players in the United States
Minnesota Twins players
Colorado Springs Sky Sox managers
People from Artemisa Province